Chaudhari may refer to:

Chowdhury, a traditional title used by the landowners in the Indian and Pakistan subcontinent; now predominantly used as a surname
Chaudhari, Nepal
the Chodri language of Gujarat
an Indian name of the Dangaura Tharu language
a dialect of the Jumli language of Nepal